Music and Lyrics: Music from the Motion Picture is the 2007 soundtrack from the film Music and Lyrics. It was released by Atlantic Records on February 13, 2007, and features songs performed by the film's stars Hugh Grant, Drew Barrymore, and Haley Bennett. The album reached #5 on the Billboard Top Soundtracks Chart and #63 on the Billboard 200.

The song "Invincible" performed by Haley Bennett that plays at the end of the film credits does not appear on the soundtrack. The same is true for the song "Work to Do", written by Adam Schlesinger (who wrote most of the songs for the film) and performed by the folk band America, which plays only at the end of the film credits.

Track listing

Charts

References 

Atlantic Records soundtracks
Pop soundtracks
2007 soundtrack albums
Comedy film soundtracks

he:מילים ולחן